Mazÿck Porcher Ravenel (1862-1946), was a  professor of preventive medicine at the University of Missouri, reaching the peak of his career by 1921. He was president of the American Public Health Association. In 1901, he was a member of the American Philosophical Society.

Selected publications
A half century of public health: jubilee historical volume of the American Public Health Association, in commemoration of the fiftieth anniversary celebration of its foundation. New York: American Public Health Association  (1921)

References

External links
Ravenel Records - American Memory. Henry Edmund Ravenel. Atlanta: The Franklin Printing and Publishing Company (1898).

1946 deaths
American public health doctors
American medical writers